Roquetas de Mar is a municipality of Almería province, in the autonomous community of Andalucía, Spain. In 2016, the population was 91,965, the municipality with the second highest population in the province behind the capital, the 14th in Andalucía and the 69th in Spain.

Geography and climate 
Roquetas de Mar has a hot semi-arid climate (Köppen: BSh) with very mild winters and very hot and dry summers. Autumn is the wettest season although the city doesn't have a real wet season. During July and August, Roquetas de Mar has often southern winds coming from Africa, thus increasing the temperatures. Dust storms coming from the Sahara desert are uncommon, but they might happen from time to time.

Tourism 
The 'urbanización' (tourist area with hotels and restaurants and shops) of Roquetas is predominantly a Spanish holiday resort for the majority of the summer months, but it also receives many visitors from the United Kingdom, Ireland and Germany. It is one of the two major resorts in Costa de Almería, the other being Mojácar.

Demographics
Roquetas de Mar is the second most populous municipality in the province of Almería behind its capital. The 2018 padron data counted 94,956 inhabitants, 49,038 of which were men and 45,887 of which were women. The population density is 1600/km².

Transport
Roquetas is served by the Autovía A-7 on its outskirts and is linked to the town itself by the A-1051. It is the second-largest town in Spain without a rail link behind Marbella; in 2020 a proposal was submitted to build a railway from Almería to Adra via Roquetas and El Ejido.

Gallery

See also 
 APRAMP
 Aguadulce (Almería)

References

External links

Municipalities in the Province of Almería
Populated coastal places in Spain